There have been two baronetcies created for persons with the surname Bradford, both in the Baronetage of the United Kingdom.

The Bradford Baronetcy, of South Audley Street in the City of Westminster in the County of London, was created in the Baronetage of the United Kingdom on 24 July 1902 for Edward Bradford. He was a colonel in the army and served as Commissioner of Police of the Metropolis from 1890 to 1903. He was succeeded by his second but eldest surviving son, the second Baronet. He was a colonel in the Seaforth Highlanders and fought in the First World War, where he was killed in action in September 1914. The baronetcy descended in the direct line until the early death of his great-grandson, the fourth Baronet, in 1954. The late Baronet was succeeded by his half-brother, the fifth and (as of 2007) present holder of the title. However, he does not use his title.

The Bradford Baronetcy, of Mawddwy in the County of Merioneth, was created in the Baronetage of the United Kingdom on 26 January 1931 for the prominent physician and physiologist John Bradford. The title became extinct on his death in 1935.

Bradford baronets, of South Audley Street (1902)

Sir Edward Ridley Colborne Bradford, 1st Baronet (1836–1911)
Sir Evelyn Ridley Bradford, 2nd Baronet (1869–1914)
Major Sir Edward Montagu Andrew Bradford, 3rd Baronet (1910–1952), killed in a riding accident
Sir John Ridley Evelyn Bradford, 4th Baronet (1941–1954), killed in a tractor accident
(Sir) Edward Alexander Slade Bradford, 5th Baronet (born 1952)
The heir presumptive to the baronetcy is the current holder's second cousin, Andrew Edward Hanning Bradford (born 1955).

Bradford baronets, of Mawddwy (1931)
Sir John Rose Bradford, 1st Baronet (1863–1935)

Notes

References
Kidd, Charles, Williamson, David (editors). Debrett's Peerage and Baronetage (1990 edition). New York: St Martin's Press, 1990.

External links
Short biography of Sir John Bradford, 1st Baronet

Baronetcies in the Baronetage of the United Kingdom
Extinct baronetcies in the Baronetage of the United Kingdom